Ahobilam is a town and holy site in the Allagadda mandal of Nandyal district in the Indian state of Andhra Pradesh. It is surrounded by picturesque hills of the Eastern Ghats with several mountain hills and gorges. It is the centre of worship of Narasimha, the lion-headed avatar of Vishnu, to whom the nine Hindu temples and other shrines all dedicated. The main village and a temple complex are at Lower Ahobilam. Upper Ahobilam, about 8 kilometres to the east, has more temples in a steep gorge.

The main Narashima Swamy temples at each site were built or expanded by the emperors of Vijayanagara in the 15th and 16th centuries, then sacked by the Mughals in 1578, then restored and expanded at various times, up to the present day. As they stand, they are a mixture of work from all these periods.

Geography
It is located in Nallamala Forest, along the Eastern Ghats.

Notes

References

Blurton, T. Richard, Hindu Art, 1994, British Museum Press,  
Michell, George (1990), The Penguin Guide to the Monuments of India, Volume 1: Buddhist, Jain, Hindu, 1990, Penguin Books, 

Hindu pilgrimage sites in India
Divya Desams
Hindu temples in Kurnool district
Devi temples in Andhra Pradesh
Narasimha temples